The 2009 GP Miguel Induráin was the 56th edition of the GP Miguel Induráin cycle race and was held on 4 April 2009. The race started and finished in Estella. The race was won by David de la Fuente.

General classification

References

2009
2009 in Spanish road cycling